Larkin University is a 501(c)(3) not-for-profit institution of higher education accredited by the Southern Association of Colleges and Schools Commission on Colleges (SACS-COC), founded in 2013 and located in Miami Gardens, Florida.

The College of Biomedical Sciences offers three post-Baccalaureate Master's degree programs in Biomedical Sciences.

The College of Pharmacy is accredited by Accreditation Council for Pharmacy Education (ACPE) and offers a three-year Doctor of Pharmacy program (the only one of its kind in Florida), and graduated its inaugural class in May 2019.
Larkin University College of Pharmacy’s Doctor of Pharmacy program is accredited by the Accreditation Council for Pharmacy Education  

Larkin University is regionally accredited by The Southern Association of Colleges and Schools Commission on Colleges (SACSCOC)

See also
Larkin Community Hospital, which initiated the startup of Larkin University

References

External links 
 Official website

2013 establishments in Florida
Educational institutions established in 2013
Pharmacy schools in Florida
Private universities and colleges in Florida
Universities and colleges in Miami-Dade County, Florida
Universities and colleges accredited by the Southern Association of Colleges and Schools